KQMK-LD, virtual channel 25 (UHF digital channel 21), is a low-powered  television station licensed to Lincoln, Nebraska, United States. The station is owned by the DTV America subsidiary of HC2 Holdings. KQMK is a sister station to KAJS-LD

History
The station's construction permit was initially issued on June 2, 2010, under the calls of K25LK-D. It was changed to the current KQMK-LD calls were assigned on February 2, 2017.

Movies! joined KQMK as a subchannel in 2020. In 2021, Decades (TV network) & Twist (TV network) were both added as subchannels on KQMK.

In Late 2021, Defy TV replaced a Informercial channel on 25.1, while Shop LC left 25.4 and MMN aka Magnificent Movies Network left 25.5 (both of which as of March 2023 are blank channels).

In February 2023, Decades TV was replaced with NTD America on 25.2 ,Movies and Twist was replaced on 25.3 and 25.7 with Infomercial channels.

Digital channels
The station's digital signal is multiplexed:

References

External links
DTV America 

Low-power television stations in the United States
Innovate Corp.
QMK-LD
Television channels and stations established in 2010
2010 establishments in Nebraska